The MAKS (Multipurpose aerospace system) (Russian: МАКС (Многоцелевая авиационно-космическая система)) is a Soviet air-launched orbiter reusable launch system project that was proposed in 1988, but cancelled in 1991. The MAKS orbiter was supposed to reduce the cost of transporting materials to Earth orbit by a factor of ten. The reusable orbiter and its external expendable fuel tank would have been launched by an Antonov AN-225 airplane, developed by Antonov ASTC (Kyiv, Ukraine).

Three variants of the MAKS system were conceived: MAKS-OS, the standard configuration with the orbiter on top of the fuel tank; MAKS-T, with upgraded payload capability and a configuration that involved the fuel tank above the orbiter; and MAKS-M, a version that included its fuel tank within the envelope of the orbiter.

As of June of 2010, Russia was considering reviving the MAKS program. In Ukraine, this project has developed into other air-launched orbiter projects, such as Svityaz and Oril.

See also 
Air launch to orbit
Buran programme
State Space Agency of Ukraine#Svityaz project
RD-701 - main engine

References

Proposed spacecraft
Spaceplanes
Cancelled Soviet spacecraft